Zafarke is a town and Union Council of Kasur District in the Punjab province of Pakistan. It is part of Kasur Tehsil and is located at 31°12'17N 74°7'30E with an altitude of 199 metres (656 feet).

References

Kasur District